Harold Anthony Fisher (born 23 March 1927) is an Australian ocean racing skipper, yachtsman and surgeon.

Early years
Tony Fisher was educated at Newington College, (1942) and the University of Sydney from where he graduated with a Bachelor of Medicine and Surgery in 1956.

Yacht racing
Fisher won line honours with a race record time, aboard Helsal, in the 1973 Sydney to Hobart Yacht Race. Helsal was designed by Joe Adams. It was named after Fisher's wife Helen and daughter Sally. Fisher has since owned four boats named Helsal with II, III and IV. Both Fisher's daughter, Sally Smith, and son, Rob Fisher, are ocean racing sailers.

References

1927 births
Living people
Australian male sailors (sport)
People educated at Newington College